Aymen Hammed (born 26 July 1983) is a Tunisian handball player for Espérance de Tunis and the Tunisian national team.

References

1983 births
Living people
Tunisian male handball players
Place of birth missing (living people)
Handball players at the 2016 Summer Olympics
Olympic handball players of Tunisia
Mediterranean Games competitors for Tunisia
Competitors at the 2013 Mediterranean Games